The Mi Amigo memorial is a war memorial at Endcliffe Park, Sheffield, England, marking the World War II crash site of the USAAF B-17 Flying Fortress Mi Amigo.

Air crash 

On 22 February 1944, the USAAF B-17 Flying Fortress aircraft Mi Amigo, from the 364th Bomber Squadron, based at Chelveston, Northamptonshire, was returning from a bombing mission over Aalborg, Denmark, during which it was heavily damaged by enemy fighter aircraft. Around 5 pm, engines faltering, it emerged out of low clouds and crashed in the park. The entire crew (pilot 1st Lt. John Kriegshauser, copilot 2nd Lt. Lyle Curtis, navigator 2nd Lt. John Humphrey, bombardier 2nd Lt. Melchor Hernandez, flight engineer/top turret gunner S/Sgt. Harry Estabrooks, radio operator S/Sgt. Bob Mayfield, ball turret gunner Sgt. Charles Tuttle, waist gunners T/Sgt. Malcolm Williams and Sgt. Vito Ambrosio, and tail gunner Sgt. Maurice Robbins) perished.

The pilot of Mi Amigo, John Kriegshauser, received a posthumous Distinguished Flying Cross for his courage in sacrificing himself and his crew, rather than allowing the plane to hit children playing in the park. Among the children were Keith Peters, aged nine, who was interviewed by Forces Broadcast Network (British Forces Broadcasting) for a 2015 documentary also broadcast on Sky TV. 

The collision site is still visible from Rustlings Road or Ecclesall Road due to a distinct decline in tree height on the hillside behind the cafe. This was due to the fact that twelve trees had to be cut down as a result of the crash's impact. Some of the surviving trees still have burn marks on their tops, which are visible in the winter.

Memorial 

A grove of ten scarlet oak trees (Quercus coccinea) was planted on 30 November 1969 as replacement trees to honour the crew, and on the same day a pair of memorial plaques attached to a large boulder were unveiled in a ceremony attended by the Lord Mayor of Sheffield, Alderman Daniel O'Neill; the Bishop of Sheffield, John Taylor, and Major General John Bell, Commander of the 3rd US Air Force in Britain. Since 2018, Tony Foulds has maintained the memorial, which for many years had been cared for by local military cadets, alongside the parks department, and Friends of Porter Valley. Mr Foulds' caretaking involves sweeping the path and watering the flowers in the Memorial Garden, which were all donated by garden centres and well-wishers. In August 2022, a reappraisal of the memorial was carried out after numerous complaints from the public, a former Lord Lieutenant of South Yorkshire, two ex-service organisations and others via the Martin Dawes blogspot and the Phoney Tony media page that the memorial had become an eye-sore and vulgar with numerous flags etc draped around, plus plant tubs blocking access. After a site meeting involving the Parks Dept of Sheffield City Council (site owners); the RAF and the Hallamshire Branch of the Royal British Legion, plus other interested individuals including Mr Foulds, the site was tied-up and access improved. However, this goodwill exercise was met with spite and derision from supporters of Mr Foulds. 

An interpretation board including a painting of Mi Amigo, by South Yorkshire artist Paul Rowland was placed near the memorial by Sheffield City Council in time for the 75th anniversary of the crash in 2019. A flagpole was also erected, funded by donations by students from Birkdale (a local school) and Boeing Europe.

An annual memorial service organised by the Sheffield branch of the Royal Air Forces Association is held at the site on the Sunday closest to 22 February. The 2021 ceremony was not held due to the Coronavirus pandemic.

Inscriptions 
The upper of the two plaques reads (all in upper case):

Erected by
Sheffield R.A.F. Association
in memory of
the ten crew of U.S.A.A.F. bomber
which crashed in this park
22-2-1944

The lower plaque lists the names of the ten crew members. Lt Kriegshauser (whose name is misspelled on the plaque) was pilot; Lt Lyle Curtis (co-pilot); Lt John Whicker Humphrey (navigator); Lt Melchor Hernandez (bomb-aimer); Sgt Robert Mayfield (radio operator/log-keeper/photographer); Sgt Harry Estabrooks (flight engineer/top-turret gunner); Sgt Charles Tuttle (lower turret gunner); Sgt Maurice Robbins (rear-gunner); Sgt Vito Ambrosio (waist-gunner and assistant radio operator) and Sgt George Malcolm Williams (waist-gunner and assistant flight engineer).

Flypast 
In January 2019, BBC Breakfast presenter Dan Walker met Tony Foulds. This led to Walker publicising Fould's wish for a commemorative flypast over the memorial.

On 22 February 2019, at 8:45 am, the United States Air Force (USAF) and Royal Air Force (RAF) carried out a fly-past to commemorate the 75th anniversary of the crash. The ten aircraft involved were, in order:

 Dakota ZA947 of the RAF's Battle of Britain Memorial Flight (flying from RAF Coningsby)
 MC-130J Commando II and CV-22 Osprey of the USAF's 352d Special Operations Wing (RAF Mildenhall)
 KC-135 Stratotanker of the USAF's 100th Air Refueling Wing (RAF Mildenhall)
 Two Typhoons of the RAF's 41 Squadron (RAF Coningsby)
 Four F-15E Strike Eagles of USAF 48th Fighter Wing (RAF Lakenheath), flying in missing man formation

The names of all ten of the Mi Amigo crew were painted onto the F-15Es. The F-15Es flew on to perform a second flypast at the American Cemetery and Memorial at Cambridge, where three of the crew are buried, the others having been repatriated.

Thousands of members of the public watched the flypast from the park, alongside relatives of the deceased air crew. BBC Breakfast was broadcast live from the event with family members of Lt Kriegshauser and Lt Hernandez as featured guests. The related hashtags "#RememberTheTen", "#MiAmigo75th" and "#sheffieldflypast" were trending on Twitter.

References

Further reading 
 

 a short paperback consisting mainly of contemporary press cuttings.
 Recommended by Dan Walker, The Times Educational Supplement, CBS and Associated Press, written using newly-released archival documentation.

External links
Sheffield Guide - Did Tony Foulds Lie About Mi Amigo?

MiAmigo
History of Sheffield